Antonio Olaguer Feliú y Heredia López y Domec (1742–1813) was a Spanish soldier and politician who spent most of his career in South America.

Biography
Born in Villafranca del Bierzo, León, Olaguer Feliú was sent to Buenos Aires as a military specialist during the governorship of Pedro de Cevallos. He took part in the siege of Colonia del Sacramento in 1777. He was named military inspector in 1783.

He served as Governor of Montevideo between August 2, 1790, and February 11, 1797, and in 1792 was promoted to Field Marshal.

Then don Antonio Olaguer Feliú was named Viceroy of the Río de la Plata, a position he occupied between May 2, 1797, and May 14, 1799. 
 
During his mandate, he had to contend with the presence of British and Portuguese forces in the Río de la Plata region, as well as nascent revolutionary sentiment inspired by the recent French Revolution. He opened the port of Buenos Aires to foreign traffic in a bid to stimulate the commercial activities of the Viceroyalty, which had begun to suffer from the growing tensions between the European powers.
 
On his return to Spain, he was named Secretary of War by Charles IV. He died in Madrid in 1813.

He was married to Ana de Azcuénaga de Olaguer Feliú.

Coat of arms
The shield was party per pale. The first party was quartered. In the first and fourth quarters, there was a mount in natural colors on an argent field. In the second and third quarters, there were an argent oval roundel surrounded by eight argent stars on a gules field. In the second party, there were five argent castles triple towered in saltire on a gules field. External ornaments: the shield had six flags and two banners characteristic of Field Marshals and other ornaments (guns, spears, halberd, sword, drums, etc.) of the profession of arms. The coat of arms had a helmet with seven bars and surmounted by a Field Marshal coronet.

Notes

References

External links 
 

1742 births
1813 deaths
People from El Bierzo
Spanish people of Catalan descent
Viceroys of the Río de la Plata
Governors of Montevideo
Spanish colonial governors and administrators
Spanish generals
Field marshals
Defence ministers of Spain